Jess Mills (born 18 November 1989) is a Scottish cricketer. In July 2018, she was named in Scotland's squad for the 2018 ICC Women's World Twenty20 Qualifier tournament.

References

External links
 

1989 births
Living people
Scottish women cricketers
Place of birth missing (living people)